The year 671 BC was a year of the pre-Julian Roman calendar. In the Roman Empire, it was known as year 83 Ab urbe condita. The denomination 671 BC for this year has been used since the early medieval period, when the Anno Domini calendar era became the prevalent method in Europe for naming years.

Events

By place

Middle East 

 King Esarhaddon of Assyria defeats the Kushite-Egyptian army of Pharaoh Taharqa and captures Memphis, along with a number of the royal family. He sets up a new Assyrian administration in Lower Egypt and withdraws.

Births

Deaths

References